Hayden Capuozzo (born October 8, 1991), better known by his stage name Kayzo, is an American DJ and based in Los Angeles, California. He is best known for remixing songs and incorporating trap and hardstyle genres into his remixes. His collaboration with Riot "Wake Up" received more than 200,000 plays in less than 24 hours.

Kayzo is also the founder of Welcome Records.

Early life 
Kayzo grew up playing hockey. In 2012, he got accepted to Icon Collective, an electronic music production school based in Los Angeles. He graduated after 9 months. He used Massive as a plugin to produce synths on his MacBook laptop. Musically, he is described as a bass artist with 'aggressive sound' and elements of hardstyle, dubstep, and trap.

Kayzo's musical career began in 2012 when he was chosen as the winner of Insomniac's "Discovery Project" challenge. Winning the challenge allowed him to perform at Escape from Wonderland that year, which was also his first gig as a DJ.

Career 
In 2013, he released the single "Malfunktion 2.0" featuring vocal duo Duelle through Borgore's record label Buygore Records. He also collaborated with Slander for the single "Gettin Down" and with Jordan Alexander for the single "Recoil". On October 21, 2014, Kayzo collaborated with Australian musician Seek N Destroy to release the single "Crank", which was described as a heavy metallic sound with impactful sub bass. On December 16, 2014, he released "Fired Up" as an EP through Firepower Records. He was featured in "Future Sounds of EDM", a compilation by Krewella released on Ministry of Sound.

In July 2015, Kayzo collaborated with Dotcom to release "Take a Picture" featuring Sam King, as a free download. In December 2015, he released "Hasselhouse" on Steve Aoki's record label Dim Mak.

In 2016, he released his debut EP "Welcome To The Doghouse" via his own label Doghouse Recordings. He later collaborated with Barong Family artist Cesqeaux to release the single "Home". He also collaborated with Gammer on the single "Frequency". Kayzo featured on the Yultron song "Tempura Roll" alongside Ookay and Dotcom.

On March 24, 2017, Kayzo released "This Time" as a single on Canadian record label Monstercat. On May 30, 2017, "Whistle Wars" was released as a single, which was described as genre-bending and bass-stomping. He was featured in the MainStage lineup of Nameless Music Festival 2017, which will be held in Barzio, Italy, on June 2, 2017. On November 21, 2017, Kayzo announced that he would be dropping his debut album, "Overload" on January 19, 2018. On August 14, 2019, Kayzo released the follow up album, “Unleashed” on Welcome Records. On June 24, 2022, Kayzo dropped his third full length album, “New Breed” on Welcome Records.

Personal life 
Capuozzo is romantically partnered with Canadian DJ and musician Cray.

Discography

Studio albums

Extended plays

Singles

As lead artist

As featured artist

Remixes 
2012
 Deorro – Phony (Kayzo Remix)
 Nervo – You're Gonna Love Again (Kayzo Remix)

2013
 Kendrick Lamar - Swimming Pools (Kayzo Remix)
 T-Pain – Buy U A Drank (Kayzo Remix)
Ying Yang Twins and Lil Jon – Salt Shaker (Kayzo Remix)

2014
 James Egbert  – Exit Wounds (featuring Nina Sung) (Kayzo Remix)
 Jack Ü  – Take Ü There (featuring Kiesza) (Kayzo Remix)
 Carnage  – Bricks (featuring Migos) (Kayzo Remix)
 Oliver Heldens – Gecko (Kayzo Remix)
 Galantis – You (Kayzo Remix)
 Snails and Antiserum – Wild (Kayzo Remix)
 Nero – Satisfy (Kayzo Remix)
 Tchami – Shot Caller (Aylen & Kayzo Remix)
TLC – No Scrubs (Kayzo Remix)
 DJ Snake and Mercer – Lunatic (Kayzo Remix)
 Above & Beyond – Sun & Moon (Kayzo Remix)
 RL Grime – Core (Kayzo Remix)
 TJR and Vinai – Bounce Generation (Kayzo Remix)

2015
 N.W.A – Fuck tha Police (Kayzo Remix)
 GTA  – Red Lips (featuring Sam Bruno) (Kayzo Remix of Skrillex's Remix)
 Knife Party – Boss Mode (Kayzo Remix)
 Alesso  – Heroes (featuring Tove Lo) (Kayzo Remix)
 Calvin Harris and Disciples – How Deep is Your Love (Kayzo Remix)
KDrew – Let Me Go (Kayzo Remix)

2016
 Porter Robinson – Language (Kayzo and Gammer Remix)
 Skrillex and Rick Ross – Purple Lamborghini (Kayzo Remix)
 Zara Larsson and MNEK – Never Forget You (Carnage and Kayzo Remix)
 DJ Snake and Yellow Claw - Ocho Cinco (Kayzo Remix)
 Tritonal - This Is Love (featuring Chris Ramos and Shanahan) (Kayzo Remix)

2017
DJ Snake featuring Lauv - A Different Way (Kayzo Remix)

2018
 Papa Roach - Last Resort (Kayzo Remix)

2019
 Yungblud and Halsey featuring Travis Barker - 11 Minutes (Kayzo Remix)
 The Bloody Beetroots - "Warp 2.019" (Steve Aoki and Kayzo Remix)

2021
 Illenium featuring Iann Dior - "First Time" (Kayzo Remix)
 Kayzo and Paris Shadows - "Poison" (Kayzo VIP)

References 

American DJs
Dubstep musicians
American electronic musicians
People from Houston
Living people
1991 births
Monstercat artists
Electronic dance music DJs